The 2019–20 season was Olympique Lyonnais's 70th professional season since its establishment in 1950 and the club's 31st consecutive season in the top flight of French football. In addition to the domestic league, Lyon participated in this season's edition of the Coupe de France, Coupe de la Ligue and the UEFA Champions League.

In May 2019, Sylvinho was announced as the new manager of the club. He was sacked on 7 October due to poor results and was replaced by Rudi Garcia seven days later.

Players

Squad information
Players and squad numbers last updated on 30 January 2019. Appearances include league matches only.Note: Flags indicate national team as has been defined under FIFA eligibility rules. Players may hold more than one non-FIFA nationality.

Transfers

In

Out

Loans in

Loans out

Transfer summary

Spending

Summer:  €97,000,000

Winter:  €36,000,000

Total:  €133,000,000

Income

Summer:  €134,450,000

Winter:  €25,000,000

Total:  €159,450,000

Net Expenditure

Summer:  €37,450,000

Winter:  €11,000,000

Total:  €26,450,000

Friendlies

Competitions

Overview

Ligue 1

League table

Results summary

Results by round

Matches
The Ligue 1 schedule was announced on 14 June 2019. The Ligue 1 matches were suspended by the LFP on 13 March 2020 due to COVID-19 until further notices. On 28 April 2020, it was announced that Ligue 1 and Ligue 2 campaigns would not resume, after the country banned all sporting events until September. On 30 April, The LFP ended officially the 2019–20 season.

Coupe de France

Coupe de la Ligue

UEFA Champions League

Group stage

Knockout phase

Statistics

Appearances and goals

|-
! colspan=14 style=background:#dcdcdc; text-align:center| Goalkeepers

|-
! colspan=14 style=background:#dcdcdc; text-align:center| Defenders

|-
! colspan=14 style=background:#dcdcdc; text-align:center| Midfielders

|-
! colspan=14 style=background:#dcdcdc; text-align:center| Forwards

|-
! colspan=14 style=background:#dcdcdc; text-align:center| Players transferred out during the season

Goalscorers

Disciplinary record

Last updated: 27 August 2019

References

Lyon
Lyon
Olympique Lyonnais seasons